Paulin Alexandre Lemaire (18 December 1882 in Maubeuge – 17 October 1932) was a French gymnast who competed at the 1900 Summer Olympics, 1908 Summer Olympics, and the 1920 Summer Olympics. He was part of the French team, which won the bronze medal in the gymnastics men's team, European system event in 1920.

References

External links
 

1882 births
1932 deaths
French male artistic gymnasts
Gymnasts at the 1900 Summer Olympics
Gymnasts at the 1908 Summer Olympics
Gymnasts at the 1920 Summer Olympics
Olympic gymnasts of France
Olympic bronze medalists for France
Olympic medalists in gymnastics
Medalists at the 1920 Summer Olympics
People from Maubeuge
Sportspeople from Nord (French department)
20th-century French people